Christ Episcopal Church was an historic Episcopal church at 909 Eddy Street in Providence, Rhode Island.

The Gothic church was built in 1888 by William R. Walker & Son and added to the National Register of Historic Places in 1976.

The church sat empty for a number of years after being closed in 1981, and began to deteriorate, earning it a place on the Providence Preservation Society annual 10 Most Endangered Properties List in 1999 and again in 2003. The building was demolished in January, 2006.

See also

National Register of Historic Places listings in Providence, Rhode Island

References

External links

Churches completed in 1888
19th-century Episcopal church buildings
Episcopal churches in Rhode Island
Demolished churches in the United States
Churches on the National Register of Historic Places in Rhode Island
Former churches in Rhode Island
Buildings and structures demolished in 2006
Demolished buildings and structures in Rhode Island
National Register of Historic Places in Providence, Rhode Island
1888 establishments in Rhode Island
2006 disestablishments in Rhode Island